Uday Pratap Singh is an Indian politician and a member of the Indian Lok Sabha from Narmadapuram (Lok Sabha constituency). He was elected as a candidate for Indian National Congress, in 2009, but later joined the Bharatiya Janata Party (BJP). He also won the 2014 and 2019 elections as a member of the BJP.

References

Living people
India MPs 2014–2019
People from Narmadapuram district
India MPs 2009–2014
Lok Sabha members from Madhya Pradesh
1964 births